This is a list of football teams based in the English county of Somerset. The teams are sorted by which domestic league they compete in. Currently, there are no football clubs based in Somerset which participate in the English Football League. Yeovil Town are the club situated in the highest division, the National League, followed by Bath City, and Taunton Town who compete one tier below in the National League South, (sixth tier). The most notable historic derby within the county is the Somerset derby between Yeovil and Bath. The leagues are listed in order of their level in the English football league system. The list only features teams from the 5th to the 10th tier of the system.

Levels 5–6 

These clubs compete in National League, comprising the sixth and fifth tier of the English football league system:

Levels 7–10

References 

Somerset
Somserset